Muyungang River is the southernmost one of right-bank tributaries in Changsha section of Xiang River in Hunan, China. The river has two branches of headwaters risen in Tiaoma Town of Yuhua District, of which the right (western) source originates from Xiyu, the left (eastern) source rises in Xintian. the two streams intersect at Sanxianling.

References

Rivers of Changsha
Tributaries of the Xiang River